Zlatan Šehović (born 8 August 2000) is a Serbian professional footballer who plays as a defender for Serbian club Partizan.

Club career
After coming through the youth system of Partizan, Šehović was loaned to affiliated side Teleoptik in early 2018. He was subsequently promoted to the Partizan first team in June. Following his promising displays during preparations for the 2018–19 season, Šehović made his official debut for the club in a UEFA Europa League qualifier against Rudar Pljevlja on 12 July, playing the full 90 minutes. During the 2018–19 season. Šehović made thirteen first-team appearances. In May 2019, he won the first trophy in his senior career, the Serbian Cup. Partizan defeated Red Star (1:0) in the Cup final, and Šehović entered the field in the 80th minute of this game.

International career
Šehović was selected by Perica Ognjenović to represent Serbia at the 2017 UEFA European Under-17 Championship. He was also capped for the under-19 team.

Statistics

Honours
Partizan
 Serbian Cup: 2018–19

Notes

References

External links
 
 

2000 births
Living people
Serbian footballers
Association football defenders
FK Partizan players
FK Teleoptik players
Maccabi Netanya F.C. players
Serbia youth international footballers
Serbian First League players
Serbian SuperLiga players
Israeli Premier League players
Footballers from Belgrade
Serbia under-21 international footballers
Expatriate footballers in Israel
Serbian expatriate sportspeople in Israel